Pozzo is an Italian surname. Notable people with the surname include:

Andrea Pozzo (1642–1709), an Italian Jesuit Brother, artist, architect and art theoretician
 Dario Pozzo, (1592–1652), Italian painter of the late-Renaissance
 Enrico Pozzo (born 1981), Italian male artistic gymnast 
 Gabriel Pozzo (born 1979), Argentine rally driver
Giampaolo Pozzo (born 1941), an Italian businessman and football club owner
Gino Pozzo (born 1965), son of Giampaolo Pozzo, owner of Watford F.C. 
Guido Pozzo (born 1951), a Catholic prelate and an official of the Roman Curia
Lilo Pozzo, American chemical engineer
 Mario Da Pozzo (born 1939), Italian former football goalkeeper
Mattia Pozzo (born 1989), Italian former professional racing cyclist
Tomás Pozzo (born 2000), Argentine professional footballer
Victor José Pozzo (born 1914), Argentine professional football player
Vittorio Pozzo (1886–1968), an Italian football coach

See also 

 Pozzi (surname)
 Pozzo (disambiguation)

Italian-language surnames